Chernihiv, also known as Chernigov, is a city and municipality in northern Ukraine, which serves as the administrative center of Chernihiv Oblast and Chernihiv Raion within the oblast. Chernihiv's population is 

The city was designated as a Hero City of Ukraine by the Ukrainian government during the 2022 Russian invasion of Ukraine.

Geography 
Chernihiv stands on the Desna River  to the north-northeast of Kyiv.

The area was served by Chernihiv Shestovytsia Airport prior to 2002, and during the Cold War it was the site of Chernihiv air base.

History

Etymology
The name "Chernihiv" is a compound name, which begins with the root 'Cherni/Cherno,' which means "black" in Slavic.  Scholars vary with interpretations of the second part of the name ("hiv"/gov", "говъ") though scholars such as Dr. Martin Dimnik, Professor of Medieval History at University of Toronto, connect Cerhnihov with the worship of "the black god" Chernibog.

Early history
Chernihiv was first mentioned (as ) in the Rus'–Byzantine Treaty (907), but the time of its establishment is unknown. Artifacts from the Khazar Khaganate uncovered by archaeological excavations at a settlement there indicate that it seems to have existed at least as early as the 9th century. Towards the end of the 10th century, the city probably had its own rulers. It was there that the Black Grave, one of the largest and earliest royal mounds in Eastern Europe, was excavated in the 19th century.

The city was the second wealthiest and most important in the southern portion of the Kievan Rus'. From the early 11th century on, it was the seat of the powerful Principality of Chernigov, whose rulers at times vied for power with Kievan Grand Princes, and often overthrew them and took the primary seat in Kiev for themselves.

The grand principality was the largest in Kievan Rus and included not only the Severian towns but even such remote regions as Murom, Ryazan and Tmutarakan. The golden age of Chernigov, when the city population peaked at 25,000, lasted until 1239 when the city was sacked by the hordes of Batu Khan, and entered a long period of relative obscurity.

The area fell under the Grand Duchy of Lithuania in 1353. The city was burned again by Crimean khan Meñli I Giray in 1482 and 1497 and in the 15th to 17th centuries changed hands several times between Lithuania, Muscovy (1408–1420 and from 1503), and the Polish-Lithuanian Commonwealth (1618–1648), where it was granted Magdeburg rights in 1623 and in 1635 became a seat of Chernihiv Voivodeship in the Lesser Poland Province.

The area's importance increased again in the middle of the 17th century during and after the Khmelnytsky Uprising. In the Hetman State Chernihiv was the city of deployment of Chernihiv Cossack regiment (both a military and territorial unit of the time).

Imperial Russia
Under the 1667 Treaty of Andrusovo the legal suzerainty of the area was ceded to the Tsardom of Russia, with Chernihiv remaining an important center of the autonomous Cossack Hetmanate. With the abolishment of the Hetmanate, the city became an ordinary administrative center of the Russian Empire and a capital of local administrative units. The area in general was ruled by the Governor-General appointed from Saint Petersburg, the imperial capital, and Chernihiv was the capital of local namestnichestvo (province) (from 1782), Malorosiyskaya or Little Russian (from 1797) and Chernigov Governorate (from 1808).

According to the census of 1897, the city of Chernihiv had 11,000 Jews out of a total population of 27,006. Their primary occupations were industrial and commercial. Many tobacco plantations and fruit gardens in the neighborhood were owned by Jews. There were 1,321 Jewish artisans in Chernihiv, including 404 tailors and seamstresses, but the demand for artisan labor was limited to the town. There were 69 Jewish day-laborers, almost exclusively teamsters. Few, however, were employed in factories.

World War II
During World War II, Chernihiv was occupied by the German Army from 9 September 1941 to 21 September 1943. The Germans operated a Nazi prison and a forced labour battalion for Jews in the city.

Recent history
The Statue of Lenin on Myru Avenue was toppled on February 21, 2014, as part of the demolitions of the statues of Lenin in Ukraine.

Until 18 July 2020, Chernihiv was designated as a city of oblast significance and did not belong to Chernihiv Raion even though it was the center of the raion. As part of the administrative reform of Ukraine, which reduced the number of raions of Chernihiv Oblast to five, the city was merged into Chernihiv Raion.

In June 2022, Chernihiv signed an agreement with Rzeszow, Poland, to become sister cities.

Siege of Chernihiv

On 24 February 2022, during the 2022 Russian invasion of Ukraine, the city was under siege by the Russian Armed Forces according to the Russian Ministry of Defense, in its first battle since the Second World War. On 10 March 2022, Mayor Vladyslav Atroshenko announced that the city had been completely encircled by Russian forces.

On 5 April 2022 Governor of Chernihiv Oblast Vyacheslav Chaus stated that the Russian military has left Chernihiv Oblast, but that it had planted mines in many areas.

Architecture

Chernihiv's architectural monuments chronicle the two most flourishing periods in the city's history – those of Kievan Rus' (11th and 12th centuries) and of the Cossack Hetmanate (late 17th and early 18th centuries.)

The oldest church in the city and one of the oldest churches in Ukraine is the 5-domed Transfiguration Cathedral, commissioned in the early 1030s by Mstislav the Bold and completed several decades later by his brother, Yaroslav the Wise. The Cathedral of Sts Boris and Gleb, dating from the mid-12th century, was much rebuilt in succeeding periods, before being restored to its original shape in the 20th century. Likewise built in brick, it has a single dome and six pillars.

The crowning achievement of Chernihiv masters was the exquisite Pyatnytska Church, constructed at the turn of the 12th and 13th centuries. This graceful building was seriously damaged in the Second World War; its original medieval outlook was reconstructed to a design by Peter Baranovsky.

The earliest residential buildings in the downtown date from the late 17th century, a period when a Cossack regiment was deployed there. Two most representative residences are those of Polkovnyk Lyzohub (1690s) and Polkovnyk Polubutok (18th century). The former mansion, popularly known as the Mazepa House, used to contain the regiment's chancellery. One of the most profusely decorated Cossack structures is undoubtedly the ecclesiastical collegium, surmounted by a bell-tower (1702). The archbishop's residence was constructed nearby in the 1780s. St Catherine Church (1715), with its 5 gilded pear domes, traditional for Ukrainian architecture, is thought to have been intended as a memorial to the regiment's exploits during the storm of Azov in 1696.

Monasteries
All through the most trying periods of its history, Chernihiv retained its ecclesiastical importance as the seat of either a bishopric or an archbishopric. At the outskirts of the modern city lie two ancient cave monasteries formerly used as the bishops' residences.

The caves of the Eletsky Monastery are said to predate those of the Kyiv Pechersk Lavra (Kyiv Monastery of the Caves). Its magnificent six-pillared cathedral was erected at the turn of the 11th to 12th centuries; some traces of its 750-year-old murals may still be seen in the interior. After the domes collapsed in 1611, they were augmented and reconstructed in the Ukrainian baroque style. The wall, monastic cells, and bell-tower all date from the 17th century.

The nearby mother superior's house is thought to be the oldest residential building in the Left-Bank Ukraine. The cloister's holiest icon used to be that of Theotokos, who made her epiphany to Svyatoslav of Chernigov on 6 February 1060. The icon, called Eletskaya after the fir wood it was painted upon, was taken to Moscow by Svyatoslav's descendants, the Baryatinsky family, in 1579.

The nearby Chernihiv Glory Memorial we can find Saint Anthony Caves of Saint Elijah and the Holy Trinity features a small eponymous church, built 800 years ago. The roomy Trinity cathedral, one of the most imposing monuments of Cossack baroque, was erected between 1679 and 1689. Its refectory, with the adjoining church of Presentation to the Temple, was finished by 1679. There are also the 17th-century towered walls, monastic cells, and the five-tiered belfry from the 1780s.

Other historic abbeys in the vicinity of Chernihiv include those in Kozelets and Hustynya, which feature superb examples of Ukrainian Baroque.

Economy

Industry
Cheksil, one of the largest enterprises in the Ukrainian textile industry, is based in Chernihiv. The first stage of the plant was put into operation in 1963. The city also has the Chernihiv Musical Instrument Factory established in 1933. In 1995 a manufacturer of goods for animals, called COLLAR Company, was established by Yuri Sinitsa.

Education
 Chernihiv has a Chernihiv National University of Technology, Chernihiv State Technological University and Taras Shevchenko National University "Chernihiv College".

Transport

Train 
 Chernihiv has a train station with bus station called Chernihiv Ovruch railway. Narrow gauge railway of 76 versts was laid from the Kruty station of the Moscow Kyiv-Voronezh railway towards Chernihiv. In 1893, on the left bank of the Desna River, in the area of a modern automobile bridge, a railway station was built along the Kyiv highway. Passengers were delivered here from the city and back by horse transport.

In 1925, traffic was opened on the Nizhyn to Chernigov section of the Southwest Railway. But rail transport in Chernihiv was postponed until 1928. The bridge over the Desna River was not ready and trains still arrived on the left bank, where the old narrow-gauge railway station was located, and passengers got to Chernihiv by road bridge. According to 2006 data, the volume of freight traffic is 84,737 wagons per year. Over 4.5 million passengers are transported each year.

However, the condition of the rolling stock and the quality of the services provided do not meet modern requirements. Since the introduction of the new high-speed train timetable, the trailed wagons of the 93/94 Chernigov – Odessa train were canceled. As of 2015, regular trains from Minsk to Odessa, and from St. Petersburg to Kyiv to Kharkiv run through Chernihiv, and there are direct connections with Moscow. Trains to Crimea (Simferopol, Feodosia) were canceled beginning December 27, 2014 due to Russia's annexation of Crimea.

Air transport 
The area was served by Chernihiv Shestovitsa Airport, and during the Cold War it was the site of Chernigov air base.

Bus 

The best way here from Kyiv is on a marshrutka from Chernihivska and Lisova metro station (100uah, two hours, around every 30 minutes), which drop off outside McDonald's (on pr Pobedy). Buses for Novhorod-Siversky leave hourly from Chernihiv's Central bus station (65uah, three hours), located near the Chernihiv train station.

Local public transport 
Public transport includes buses and trolleybuses. There is no direct connection between railway station and Chernihiv-1 bus station to the most central sights on the Val – you will have to take any trolleybus or bus from the station to crossing of Myru Avenue and Prospekt Pobedy (Hotel Ukraine stop; look for the end of the boulevard along Myru Avenue near it), and then walk through historical centre a little.

Trolleybus 1 and bus 38 will take you even one stop further, to Drama Theater stop near Pyatnytska Church, but no further. Consult a map, as different routes come to Hotel Ukraine from different sides, you will have to walk along Myru Avenue along its continuation after boulevard ends.

Sports and facilities

FC Desna Chernhiv 
 
The main Football club of Chernihiv is called FC Desna Chernihiv, the original name of the club was "Avanhard Chernihiv" during its first year of existence. Between 1961 and 1970 the club was called Desna. In 1972 it was replaced with SC Chernihiv (team of the SKA Kyiv) that played in Chernihiv for the next couple of years. In 1977 Desna was revived now in place of the amateur club "Khimik Cherhihiv" that won regional competitions. On 27 May 2018, the team got promoted to the Ukrainian Premier League for the first time in their history.

The original team colours were blue shirts, blue shorts, blue socks.  The team got into the Quarterfinals of the Ukrainian Cup in the season 2017–18 against Dynamo Kyiv. The club and during the season 2019–20 got again into the Quarterfinals of the Ukrainian Cup for the second time of the history of the club. In Premier League in the season 2019–20, Desna got into the play-offs for the Championship round table and qualified mathematically at least for the Europa League third qualifying round, for the first time in the history of the Club since 1960.

FC Chernihiv 
FC Chernihiv is another club in the city of Chernihiv, founded in 2003, which they play in Chernihiv Arena, they won the Chernihiv Oblast Football Championship. The club in 2020, got a certificate for vistup to participate for the Ukrainian Second League for the season 2020–21. For the first time in the entire history, the place will be represented in professional football by two teams, one of which is FC Desna Chernihiv. In 2022 the club was admitted into the Ukrainian First League for the season 2022–23, keeping high the name of the city in the sport sphere.

WFC Lehenda-ShVSM Chernihiv 
WFC Lehenda-ShVSM Chernihiv is Ukrainian professional women's football club from Chernihiv. The team won 6 times the Top Division, four times the Women's Cup and been in both competition second only behind Zhytlobud-1 Kharkiv. The club won also the Italy Women's Cup in 2007. In the 2001–02, 2003–04, 2006–07 seasons they played in the UEFA Women's Cup.

Sport complex

Stadion Yuri Gagarin
 
The Club of FC Desna Chernihiv played at the Olympic sports training center "Chernihiv" (formerly Stadion Yuriya Gagarina). The Stadion Yuri Gagarin in Chernihiv and it was built in 1936 for 3,000 spectators in eastern portion of a city park (garden) that exists since 1804 and where previously was located residence of the Chernihiv Archbishops.

Chernihiv Arena
The city of Chernihiv has also another sport complex called Chernihiv Arena in Kil'tseva St, 2а, Chernihiv, Chernihiv Oblast, Ukraine, 14039. Here play the club FC Chernihiv, WFC Lehenda-ShVSM Chernihiv the Ukrainian professional women's football club of city and sometimes by Desna-2 Chernihiv, Desna-3 Chernihiv.

Cemeteries
Old Jewish Cemetery
Old Cemetery
Yatsevo Cemetery
Yelovschyna Cemetery
Kotovske Cemetery
Stara Basan Cemetery
Radomka Cemetery
Palchyky Selo Cemetery
Kholmy Ukraine Cemetery

Rivers

Desna River  
The city of Chernihiv is crossed by Desna River which is a river in Russia and Ukraine, a major left tributary of the Dnieper river.

Snov River 
Chernihiv also has the Snov river in Bryansk Oblast in Russia and Chernihiv Oblast in Ukraine, right tributary of the Desna River (Dnieper's basin). The Snov freezes in November – late January and stays icebound until March – early April. Part of the river forms the Russia–Ukraine border.

According to Ruthenian chronicles, in 1068 a battle took place at the Snov River between Duke of Chernihiv Sviatoslav Yaroslavich and Cumans led by Duke Sharukan.

Climate
Chernihiv has a humid continental climate (Köppen Dfb) with cold, cloudy and snowy winters, and warm, sunny summers. Precipitation is well distributed throughout the year though precipitation is higher during the summer months and lower during the winter months.

Gallery

Honorary citizens 
 List of honorary citizens of Chernihiv

Notable people

 Vladimir Antonov-Ovseenko (1883–1938), Soviet Bolshevik leader and diplomat
 Vladyslav Atroshenko (born 1968) a Ukrainian politician and mayor of Chernihiv.
 Angelica Balabanoff (1878–1965) a Jewish Russian-Italian social democratic activist. 
 Xenia Belmas (1890–1981) a Ukrainian soprano, doyenne of the Paris Opera
 Oleksandr Chemerov (born 1981) rock musician and frontman of rock band Dymna Sumish
 Stepan Davydov (1777–1825) an Imperial Russian composer and singer. 
 Olga Della-Vos-Kardovskaya (1875–1952) a Russian painter and graphic artist. 
 Nikolai Fedorovich Drozdov (1862–1953), scientist and Red Army general
 Alter Esselin (1889–1974) a Jewish-American poet who wrote in the Yiddish language.
 Haim Gamzu (1910–1982) an Israeli art and drama critic.
 Mordechai Hershman (1888–1940) an American Jewish cantor ("chazzan") and singer.
 Isaac of Chernigov (12th C.) a Russian-Jewish scholar on questions of Biblical exegesis
 Giennadij Jerszow (born 1967), Polish and Ukrainian sculptor and jewellery designer
 Yehuda L. Katzenelson (1846–1917) a military doctor, writer and publicist of Hebrew Literature.
 Anna Leporskaya (1900–1982), Soviet avant-garde artist
 Oleh Liashko (born 1972) a Ukrainian politician and journalist, leader of the Radical Party.
 Mykola Marchenko (born 1943) sculptor
 Anna Maximovitch (1901–1943) a Russian aristocrat and neuropsychiatrist
 Basile Maximovitch (1902–1944) Russian aristocrat, mining engineer and Soviet agent
 Zelda Mishkovsky (1914–1984), known as Zelda, an Israeli poet. 
 Solomon Nikritin (1898–1965) a painter, avant-garde artist, philosopher and author.
 Alexander Ozersky (1813–1880) a noble Russian military geologist and governor of Tomsk.
 Anatoly Rybakov (1911–1998) Soviet and Ukrainian writer of novels and children books
 Valeria Shashenok (born 2001), Ukrainian photographer and 2022 war refugee
 Sviatoslav III of Kiev (1126–1194) ruled Kiev alongside Rurik Rostislavich
 Yulia Svyrydenko (born 1985) First Vice Prime Minister of Ukraine since November 2021.
 Jacob Tamarkin (1888–1945), Russian-American mathematician 
 Dora Wasserman (1919–2003) a Jewish-Canadian actress, playwright and theatre director.

Sport 

 Oleksandr Batyuk (born 1960) cross-country skier, team silver medallist at the 1984 Winter Olympics
 Denys Bezborodko (born 1994), Ukrainian footballer with 200 club caps
 Yana Doroshenko (born 1994), Ukrainian-born Azerbaijani volleyball player
 Vitaliy Havrysh (born 1986) retired Ukrainian footballer with 400 club caps
 Yuriy Hruznov (born 1947), goalkeeper and coach, 116 club caps with FC Desna Chernihiv
 Tatiana Kostiuk (born 1982) French chess player and Woman chess Grandmaster.
 Alexander Kovchan (born 1983) a Ukrainian chess Grandmaster
 Tatiana Melamed (born 1974) German Woman chess grandmaster
 Dmytro Mytrofanov (born 1989) a Ukrainian middleweight professional boxer
 Andriy Protsko (born 1947), Ukrainian footballer, over 300 club caps for FC Desna Chernihiv
 Vladimir Savon (1940–2005) a Ukrainian chess player and Grandmaster.
 Yukhym Shkolnykov (1939–2009) Ukrainian coach and Soviet footballer.
 Eduard Weitz (born 1946), Israeli Olympic weightlifter
 Andriy Yarmolenko (born 1989), Ukrainian footballer with 350 club caps and 109 for Ukraine plays for West Ham

Twin towns – sister cities

Chernihiv is twinned with:

 Gabrovo, Bulgaria
 Gomel, Belarus
 Hradec Králové, Czech Republic
 Lappeenranta, Finland
 Memmingen, Germany
 Ogre, Latvia
 Petah Tikva, Israel
 Prilep, North Macedonia
 Rzeszów, Poland
 Tarnobrzeg, Poland

Notes

References

Sources

 Ocherk istorii goroda Chernigova 907–1907 gg. (Chernihiv 1908)
 Hrushevs'kyi, M. (ed). Chernihiv i Pivnichne Livoberezhzhia (Kyiv 1928)

 Rybakov, B. Drevnosti Chernigova (Moscow 1949)
 Ignatkin, I. Chernigov (Kyiv 1955)
 Iedomakha, I. Chernihiv (Kyiv 1958)
 
 Asieiev, Iu. Arkhitektura Kyïvs'koï Rusi (Kyiv 1969)
 Karnabida, A. Chernihiv. Istorychno-arkhitekturnyi narys (Kyiv 1969)
 (1972) Історіа міст і сіл Української CCP – Чернігівська область (History of Towns and Villages of the Ukrainian SSR – Chernihiv Oblast), Kyiv. 
 Asieiev, Iu. Dzherela. Mystetstvo Kyïvs'koï Rusi (Kyiv 1980)

External links

 Chernihiv City Portal
 chernigiv-rada.gov.ua — Official webportal of the Chernihiv City Rada 
 Chernihiv guide 
 Chernihiv in the Encyclopedia of Ukraine
 "Chernigov-Gethsemane" Icon of the Mother of God. Russian Orthodox Cathedral of St. John the Baptist, Washington DC. (ROCOR).
 Chernihiv Sketch Map — Sketch Map of Chernihiv
 Chernihiv souvenirs — Chernihiv Gifts and Souvenirs
 History of Jewish Community in Chernigov
 The murder of the Jews of Chernihiv during World War II, at Yad Vashem website.

 
Cities in Chernihiv Oblast
Populated places on the Desna in Ukraine
Chernigovsky Uyezd
Cossack Hetmanate
Chernihiv Voivodeship
Archaeological sites in Ukraine
Severians
Rus' settlements
Shtetls
Cities of regional significance in Ukraine
Holocaust locations in Ukraine
Oblast centers in Ukraine
Populated places established in the 10th century